Eric L. Harry (born December 2, 1958) is an American author and lawyer, best known for his novels Arc Light and Invasion. He has also written Society of the Mind, along with Protect and Defend.

Early life and education
Harry was born in Ocean Springs, Mississippi on December 2, 1958, and grew up in Laurel, Mississippi. He attended the Marion Military Institute and the Marine Military Academy. He also attended Vanderbilt University, earning a B.A. in 1980, an MBA in 1983, and a JD in 1984.

Career
Harry practiced mergers and acquisitions law in Houston, Texas as an associate at Bracewell & Patterson (now Bracewell & Giuliani), and a partner for Chamberlain, Hrdlicka, White, Williams & Martin, and as a Vice President and Assistant General Counsel for Apache Corporation, a Senior Vice President and General Counsel of El Paso Exploration and Production Company, and an Executive Vice President of Acquisitions, General Counsel and Chief Compliance Officer of Sheridan Production Partners, which he co-founded upon leaving El Paso in 2006. Harry retired from the practice of law in 2014 to resume his writing career; he is due to release his next book Pandora: Outbreak in January 2018.

Personal life
Harry is married to his wife, Marina and has two sons and one daughter.

Bibliography

References

External links
 
 
 Eric L. Harry at Fantastic Fiction

1958 births
Living people
Marion Military Institute alumni
Mississippi lawyers
People from Laurel, Mississippi
People from Ocean Springs, Mississippi
Vanderbilt University alumni
Novelists from Mississippi
American male novelists
20th-century American novelists
20th-century American lawyers
21st-century American lawyers
20th-century American male writers